Saved My Life may refer to:
 Saved My Life (Lil Louis & the World song)
 Saved My Life (Sia song)